The Water is the third studio album by the Australian indie rock band San Cisco. It was released on 5 May 2017. The album peaked at number 17 on the ARIA Chart.

Track listing

Charts

Release history

References

2017 albums
San Cisco albums